Angoumois, historically the County of Angoulême, was a county and province of France, originally inferior to the parent duchy of Aquitaine, similar to the Périgord to its east but lower and generally less forested, equally with occasional vineyards throughout. Its capital was Angoulême with its citadel and castle above the river Charente.

It almost corresponds to the Charente Department which also takes in the east of the coastal comté de Saintonge.

History

This area was a county and province of France, originally inferior to the parent duchy of Aquitaine, similar to the Périgord to its east.  Many of the historic churches and castles, or castle ruins in the county, survive. Today it is noted for sunflowers and Cognac, the archetypal brandy, one of its small towns being at its origin, as much as its historic mainstay crops of corn and wheat.   In the High Middle Ages, an enlarged Aquitaine pledged loyalty to the Angevin kings of England. Their claims in France triggered the Hundred Years' War, in which the kingdom of France emerged victorious in the 1450s, with many incorporated areas coming to be ruled directly by the French kings.

References

Further reading
Profile, britannica.com. Accessed 17 October 2022.

 
Former provinces of France
Geography of Charente
History of Nouvelle-Aquitaine

Former counties of France